FC Ararat Moscow was a Russian football team based in Moscow that represented the Armenian diaspora in Russia. It was founded in 2017 and joined the Russian Professional Football League replacing FC Vityaz. The club was named after the Armenian club FC Ararat Yerevan.

History 
The club was founded in 2017 with the support of the Armenian Youth Association of Moscow. On 30 May 2017, the club received the Russian Football Union license for participation in the 2017–18 Russian Professional Football League season and signed a former Russia international forward Roman Pavlyuchenko. Pavlyuchenko was soon joined at Ararat by two more former national team players, Marat Izmailov and Aleksei Rebko.

On 30 July 2017, Sergei Bulatov resigned from his position as manager, Arkadi Imrekov taking over as caretaker manager. On 16 August 2017, Aleksandr Grigoryan was announced as Ararat's new permanent manager.

On 31 August 2017, the club announced that the club president Valeri Oganesyan has resigned and left for Georgia, and the financial audit conducted by the club discovered that Oganesyan transferred 20 million rubles (approx. €292,000) of club's funds to his personal accounts before leaving. The club lodged a complaint with the police to open criminal investigation into the matter. A week later, the media businessman Ashot Gabrelyanov (of Life news agency) who is involved in the management in the club, announced that the financials of the club are stable and the financial dispute with Oganesyan is settled, and the club is sponsored by billionaire Samvel Karapetyan and businessman Kamo Avagumyan.

On 26 October 2017, Grigoryan resigned as the manager despite Ararat leading the league decisively at the moment.

On 17 November 2017, Samvel Karapetyan was appointed the president of the club and Igor Zvezdin as the head coach. Dmitri Beznyak is officially registered with the league as the head coach and Zvezdin as senior coach-analyst.  On 12 April 2018, Zvezdin left the club and was replaced by Maksim Bukatkin.

On 28 April 2018, Ararat secured first place in the Centre Zone of the PFL and the right to promotion to the second-tier Russian Football National League. Ararat initially were refused a license for the FNL, but appealed against the decision. The appeal was declined on 30 May 2018.

On 9 January 2019, Ararat Moscow announced their return to Russian football, entering the Russian Professional Football League for the 2019–20 season. On 5 February 2020, Russian Football Union excluded Ararat from RPFL once again for failing licensing. The club was 8th in the table at the time.

League and cup history

Statistics

Top goalscorers

Managerial
Information correct as of match played 26 May 2018. Only competitive matches are counted.

Notes:

References

External links
  Official VK site

 
Association football clubs established in 2017
Football clubs in Moscow
Armenian association football clubs outside Armenia
Russian people of Armenian descent
2017 establishments in Russia
2020 disestablishments in Russia
Association football clubs disestablished in 2020
Armenian diaspora in Russia